Françoise Hardy is the second studio album of the French popular singer Françoise Hardy, released in October 1963 on LP by French label Disques Vogue (FH 1). She was accompanied by the Marcel Hendrix Orchestra. Like  Hardy's previous album, the album was released with no title, except for her name on the cover, and this album colloquially become known by the title of its most successful song, "Le Premier Bonheur du jour" ("The First Joy of the Day").

"Le premier bonheur du jour" was covered by Brazilian band Os Mutantes on their debut 1968 album, and decades later on the 2014 album Dream a Little Dream by Pink Martini and The von Trapps.

Track listing 
Except as noted, lyrics and music were written by Françoise Hardy.

 "Le Premier Bonheur du jour" (lyrics: Franck Gérald; music: Jean Renard) – 1:53 
 "Va pas prendre un tambour" (lyrics: Maurice Vidalin; music: Jacques Dutronc) – 2:50 
 "Saurai-je?" – 2:05
 "Toi je ne t'oublierai pas" (lyrics: André Salvet, Claude Carrère; music: Jean-Pierre Bourtayre) – 2:24 
 "Avant de t'en aller" (original title: "Think About It", lyrics and music: Paul Anka) – 1:57  First performed by: Paul Anka, 1963; French adaptation: Françoise Hardy
 "Comme tant d'autres" – 2:35
 "J'aurais voulu" – 2:10
 "Nous tous" – 1:43
 "L'Amour d'un garçon" (original title: "The Love of a Boy", lyrics: Hal David; music: Burt Bacharach) – 2:10  First performed by: Timi Yuro, 1962, French adaptation: Françoise Hardy
 "Le sais-tu ?" – 1:44
 "L'Amour ne dure pas toujours" – 1:45
 "On dit de lui" (original title: "It's Gonna Take Me Some Time", lyrics and music: Don Christopher, Don Stirling, Harold Temkin) – 2:42  First performed by: Connie Francis, 1962, French adaptation: Françoise Hardy

Editions

LP records: first editions in the English-speaking world 
 , 1964: Trans-Canada Record/Disques Vogue (FH 1).
 , 1964: In Vogue, Pye Records (NPL 18099).
 , 1965: Disques Vogue (VGL 7004).

Reissues on CD 
 , 1996: Disques Vogue/Sony/BMG (7 43213 80032).
 , 2014: Le Premier Bonheur du jour, RDM Edition (CD687).
, 16 October 2015: Le Premier Bonheur du jour, Light in the Attic Records/Future Days Recordings (FDR 615).

Reissue on 180g Vinyl 
, January 2016: Le Premier Bonheur du jour, Light in the Attic Records/Future Days Recordings (FH 1)-(FDR 615).

Notes and references 

Françoise Hardy albums
1963 albums
French-language albums
Disques Vogue albums